Edward "Wingy" Stevenson (11 April 1901 – 19 July 1977) was an Australian rules footballer who played with Geelong in the Victorian Football League (VFL).

The pint-sized Stevenson was a wingman, who Geelong recruited locally from Chilwell. He could also play as a forward but was on the wing when he played in the 1925 VFL Grand Final, which Geelong won to claim their first VFL premiership.

References

External links

1901 births
1977 deaths
Australian rules footballers from Victoria (Australia)
Geelong Football Club players
Geelong Football Club Premiership players
Chilwell Football Club players
One-time VFL/AFL Premiership players